T-bone is a steak of beef.

T-bone may also refer to:

Music
 Trombone (nickname)
 T-Bone Concerto, a concerto for trombone and wind orchestra by Johan de Meij
 The T-Bones, an American instrumental pop/rock group
 "T-Bone", a song from the album Re·ac·tor by Neil Young and Crazy Horse

People
 T Bone Burnett (born 1948), American musician, songwriter and producer
 T-Bone Slim (1890–1942), pen name for American poet, songwriter and labour activist Matti Valentine Huhta
 T-Bone Walker (1910–1975), American blues guitarist, singer and songwriter
 T-Bone Wilson, Guyanese-British actor, dramatist and poet
 T-Bone (rapper), American Christian rapper
 Tony "T-Bone" Bellamy (1946–2009), lead guitarist, pianist and vocalist for the band Redbone
 Tom "T-Bone" Stankus, American children's musician
 Tom "T-Bone" Wolk (1951–2010), American bassist
 Teebone, British UK garage/drum and bass producer and DJ

Fictional characters
 Captain T-Bone, from the One Piece manga series
 Chance "T-Bone" Furlong, an anthropomorphic feline from the series SWAT Kats: The Radical Squadron
 T-Bone, an arsonist and George Bluth's cell-mate in Arrested Development
 T-Bone, a canine character in the television series Clifford the Big Red Dog
 T-Bone Mendez, in the videogame Grand Theft Auto: San Andreas
 Raymond Kenney, also known as T-Bone from Watch Dogs series
 T-Bone, a skeleton who is a minor character in Skylanders series
 T-Bone, a skeleton who is a villain in the video game Cuphead
 T-Bone, a bull villager from the video game series Animal Crossing

Other uses
 T Bone N Weasel, a 1992 television film directed by Lewis Teague
 Beechcraft Twin Bonanza, a light twin-engined airplane popularly nicknamed "T-Bone" in the aviation community
 Kansas City T-Bones, an Independent Northern League minor league baseball team in Kansas City
 T-bone accident, where one vehicle crashes into the side of another vehicle